is a retired Japanese athlete. She won a gold medal in the 4 × 100 m relay and a silver in the long jump at the 1951 Asian Games. She placed 16th in the long jump at the 1952 Summer Olympics.

References

1933 births
Possibly living people
Japanese female sprinters
Japanese female long jumpers
Olympic female sprinters
Olympic female long jumpers
Olympic athletes of Japan
Athletes (track and field) at the 1952 Summer Olympics
Asian Games gold medalists for Japan
Asian Games silver medalists for Japan
Asian Games medalists in athletics (track and field)
Athletes (track and field) at the 1951 Asian Games
Medalists at the 1951 Asian Games
Japan Championships in Athletics winners
20th-century Japanese women